The 1995 Muratti Time Indoor, known as such for sponsorship reasons, was an ATP men's tennis tournament played on indoor carpet courts at the Assago Forum Milan, Italy that was part of the Championship Series of the 1995 ATP Tour. It was the 18th edition of the tournament and took place from 13 February until 19 February 1995. Fifth-seeded Yevgeny Kafelnikov won the singles title and earned $128,000 first-prize money.

Finals

Singles

 Yevgeny Kafelnikov defeated  Boris Becker, 7–5, 5–7, 7–6(8–6)
 It was Kafelnikov's 1st singles title of the year and the 4th of his career.

Doubles

 Boris Becker /  Guy Forget defeated  Petr Korda /  Karel Nováček, 6–2, 6–4

References

External links
 ITF tournament edition details

Milan Indoor
Milan Indoor
Milan Indoor
Milan Indoor